State Street is the first station along the Blue Island Branch of the Metra Electric line in the West Pullman neighborhood of Chicago, Illinois.

A station typology adopted by the Chicago Plan Commission on October 16, 2014, assigns the State Street typology of Low Density Neighborhood. The station is surrounded primarily by residential uses. Most riders walk or bike to the station. There is no commuter parking lot for this station, but there is still parking near the station.

Bus connections
CTA

  34 South Michigan (Owl Service)

References

External links

Station from State Street from Google Maps Street View
Michigan Avenue entrance from Google Maps Street View

Metra stations in Chicago